General elections were held in Northern Rhodesia in 1938. An additional unofficial member was appointed to the Legislative Council to represent African interests.

Electoral system
The seven elected members of the Legislative Council were elected from seven single-member constituencies. There were a total of 3,932 registered voters.

Results

Aftermath
Stewart Gore-Browne was appointed as the member representing African interests.

References

1938 elections in Africa
1938 in Northern Rhodesia
1938
1938